Edward Gildea De Corsia (September 29, 1903 – April 11, 1973) was an American radio, film, and television actor, best remembered for his roles as the ex-wrestler murderer Willie Garzah in the film The Naked City (1948) and as a gangster who turned state's evidence in the film The Enforcer (1951).

Career

Radio
De Corsia was a member of the cast of Blackstone Plantation. He starred in the title role on Mike Hammer and played Sergeant Velie on The Adventures of Ellery Queen. He also voiced roles on Family Theater, The March of Time, Cavalcade of America, Gang Busters, and The Shadow.

Film

He made his film debut in Orson Welles' The Lady from Shanghai (1947) and went on to make a career playing villains and gangsters in 1940s and 1950s films, including The Naked City (1948), The Enforcer (1951), Crime Wave (1954), The Big Combo (1955), The Killing (1956), Baby Face Nelson, Slightly Scarlet (1956), and The Joker is Wild (1957).

In his last feature, The Outside Man (1972) with Ann-Margret and Angie Dickinson, his character, the mobster Victor, is killed off early in the film, but he later appears as his embalmed corpse, posed in a chair, holding a cigar.

Television
In the late 1950s and 1960s, he appeared in a number of television series, mostly westerns. He was featured on three episodes of the CBS courtroom drama series Perry Mason, including the episodes "The Case of the Drifting Dropout" (1964), in which he played murder victim Mort Lynch, and "The Case of the Positive Negative" (1966), in the role of murder victim George Emory. Other television appearances included The Californians, The Lone Ranger, Maverick, Have Gun Will Travel (1957), Tales of Wells Fargo,The Untouchables, Sugarfoot, Jefferson Drum, Richard Diamond, Private Detective, Frontier Doctor, Mackenzie's Raiders, Riverboat, Tate, The Rifleman, The Twilight Zone, Sea Hunt, Lawman, Stoney Burke, Rawhide, Daniel Boone, Gunsmoke, 77 Sunset Strip, The Dakotas, I Dream of Jeannie, Get Smart, Zane Grey Theater, The Outer Limits (episode "The Inheritors", 1964), Rango, and The Monkees, episodes "Hitting The High Seas", (1967) and "The Devil and Peter Tork", (1968).

Filmography

Selected television

References

External links

1903 births
1973 deaths
Male actors from New York City
American male film actors
American male radio actors
American male television actors
American people of Italian descent
People from Brooklyn
20th-century American male actors
Western (genre) television actors